Agelacrinitidae is an extinct family of prehistoric echinoderms in the class Edrioasteroidea.

References 

 Spiraclavus nacoensis, a new species of clavate agelacrinitid edrioasteroid from central Arizona. CD Sumrall, Journal of Paleontology, 1992
 Agelacrinitidae at fossilworks

Edrioasteroidea
Prehistoric echinoderm families